Mark Aguilar Villar (born August 14, 1978) is a Filipino politician and businessman serving as a Senator since 2022. He served in President Rodrigo Duterte's cabinet as the Secretary of Public Works and Highways from 2016 to 2021, and was the COVID-19 pandemic isolation czar from 2020 to 2021. A member of the Nacionalista Party, he was the Representative of Las Piñas from 2010 to 2016. Villar has also previously held executive positions in his family's businesses.

Villar hails from a political dynasty based in Las Piñas. His mother, Cynthia, is his colleague in the Senate, while his father, Manny, is a billionaire businessman and former Senate President. His sister, Camille, is a congresswoman, and his wife Emmeline is also a politician.

Early life 
Villar was born on August 14, 1978, to businesspersons Manny Villar and Cynthia Villar. He is the second of three children, with an older brother, Manuel Paolo, and younger sister, Camille Lydia. He attended the International School Manila in Makati, Metro Manila before moving to the United States to pursue higher education. He earned his bachelor's degree in Economics, Political Science and Philosophy from the Wharton School of the University of Pennsylvania. He also finished his master's degree in Business Administration from the University of Chicago Booth School of Business.

On his return to the Philippines, he worked for 10 years in the family's real estate business. He was President of Crown Asia Corporation before becoming managing director of Vista Land & Lifescapes.

Political career 
Villar was first elected to public office in 2010 as congressman of the lone district of Las Piñas, succeeding his mother, Cynthia Villar, a three-term representative who later became senator. During his term, he served as Chairman of the House Committee on Trade and Industry, as well as Vice Chairman of the House Committees on Overseas Workers Affairs, Labor and Employment, and Science and Technology.

As a member of the 15th and 16th Congress, he authored several bills on education, health and livelihood, including the Negosyo Act promoting micro finance and the Lemon Law protecting buyers of motor vehicles. He was also one of the proponents of the Co-Loading Act which opened domestic transport and shipping to foreign vessels.

Villar ran for a third term during the 2016 elections and won. A special election was supposed to be held to replace Villar who joined the Cabinet of President Rodrigo Duterte as Secretary of Public Works and Highways on August 1, 2016. Pending the special election to be held in Las Piñas to fill in Villar's seat in the lower house, House Speaker Pantaleon Alvarez has designated his wife, Emmeline Aglipay-Villar, as interim representative. Aglipay-Villar later became an undersecretary of the Department of Justice and was part of the team that reviewed the water concession agreements of Maynilad Water Services and Manila Water. However, the special election was never held up to the end of the 17th Congress.

These projects were also part of the Build! Build! Build! program of the Duterte administration. The department faced controversy when Senator Panfilo Lacson flagged  worth of DPWH infrastructure projects that had already been financed by the government for implementation in 2020 but were funded again for 2021. Duterte defended Villar for not being involved in the issue, saying that he is already rich. Villar formed a task force that led to relieving 14 personnel due to corruption. 

Villar resigned as Secretary of Public Works and Highways effective October 6, 2021. On the same day, he filed his certificate of candidacy (COC) to run for senator in 2022. His candidacy is endorsed by President Duterte. He was named to the senatorial slate of UniTeam Alliance, having been endorsed by the tandem of Bongbong Marcos and Sara Duterte. He won in his first senatorial bid, ranking 6th out of the 12 winning senatorial bets with more than 19 million votes. He and his mother Cynthia Villar became the first mother-and-son tandem as incumbent senators since Loi Ejercito and Jinggoy Estrada in the 13th Congress (2004–2007). Villar was elected as the Chairman of the Senate Committee on Banks, Financial Institutions and Currencies and the Senate Committee on Trade, Commerce and Entrepreneurship.

Personal life 
Villar is married to a fellow lawmaker, Emmeline Yan Aglipay, daughter of Edgar Aglipay and former Department of Justice Undersecretary whom he met during the 15th Congress. They have a daughter, Emma Therese.

On July 15, 2020, Villar tested positive for COVID-19. He was able to recover from the disease.

Notes

References 

|-

|-

1978 births
21st-century Filipino businesspeople
Living people
Secretaries of Public Works and Highways of the Philippines
Members of the House of Representatives of the Philippines from Las Piñas
Nacionalista Party politicians
Wharton School of the University of Pennsylvania alumni
University of Chicago Booth School of Business alumni
Duterte administration cabinet members
Senators of the 19th Congress of the Philippines